William Silen (born 29 July 1949) is a Puerto Rican athlete. He competed in the men's hammer throw at the 1972 Summer Olympics.

References

1949 births
Living people
Athletes (track and field) at the 1972 Summer Olympics
Puerto Rican male hammer throwers
Olympic track and field athletes of Puerto Rico
Place of birth missing (living people)